North Court is a historic dormitory building located on the University of Richmond campus in Richmond, Virginia. The building was originally built for Westhampton College, which together with Richmond College became the University of Richmond in 1920. It was designed by architect Ralph Adams Cram and built in 1911 in the Collegiate Gothic style. The three- to four-story building is constructed of brick, stone, and concrete and has a "U" shaped plan with an encloses a courtyard with one open corner on the northwest end.

It was listed on the National Register of Historic Places in 2013.

References

University of Richmond
University and college buildings on the National Register of Historic Places in Virginia
Gothic Revival architecture in Virginia
Buildings and structures completed in 1911
Buildings and structures in Richmond, Virginia
National Register of Historic Places in Richmond, Virginia